Mark McNeill (born February 22, 1993) is a Canadian ice hockey forward who is currently playing for Selber Wölfe of the DEL2. He was selected 18th overall in the 2011 NHL Entry Draft by the Chicago Blackhawks, and he was also selected by Vityaz Chekhov in the fifth round (112th overall) of the 2011 KHL Junior Draft.

Early life
McNeill played with major junior hockey with the Prince Albert Raiders of the WHL. Mark has two older siblings, Megan and David, and parents Bernie and Pamela, who reside in Edmonton.

Playing career
During the 2016–17 season, while with the AHL affiliate the Rockford IceHogs, and unable to make the Blackhawks roster after four full seasons within the organization, McNeill was traded along with a conditional fourth-round pick to the Dallas Stars in exchange for the return of Johnny Oduya on February 28, 2017.

On June 26, 2017, as a restricted free agent McNeill agreed to a one-year, two-way contract extension with the Stars.

During the 2017–18 season, while with the Texas Stars in the AHL, McNeill was traded by Dallas to the Nashville Predators in exchange for Andrew O'Brien on February 3, 2018. He joined the Predators AHL affiliate, the Milwaukee Admirals, and contributed with 19 points in 31 games.

As a free agent in the off-season, McNeill signed a one-year, two-way contract with the Boston Bruins on July 1, 2018.

After seven professional seasons contracted in the NHL, McNeill left as a free agent to sign his first European contract on a one-year deal with Austrian club, EHC Black Wings Linz of the EBEL on July 2, 2019.

International play
McNeill first played in an international event at the 2010 World U-17 Hockey Challenge for Canada Pacific. He was later selected to Team Canada at the 2011 IIHF World U18 Championships. He appeared in 7 games and collected 6 assists in a fourth-place finish. He mirrored his fourth-place finish for Team Canada at the 2013 World Junior Championships with no points through 6 games.

Career statistics

Regular season and playoffs

International

Awards and honours

References

External links
 

1993 births
EHC Black Wings Linz players
Canadian ice hockey centres
Chicago Blackhawks draft picks
Chicago Blackhawks players
Dallas Stars players
Frederikshavn White Hawks players
Ice hockey people from British Columbia
Living people
National Hockey League first-round draft picks
People from Langley, British Columbia (city)
Prince Albert Raiders players
Providence Bruins players
Rockford IceHogs (AHL) players
Texas Stars players
HC Vita Hästen players